Francis Jettner was an Australian politician who represented the South Australian House of Assembly multi-member seat of Burra Burra from 1927 to 1930 for the Liberal Federation.

References

Members of the South Australian House of Assembly